François Lemasson (born 15 November 1963 in Limoges) is a French former professional footballer who played as a goalkeeper.

He was the goaltender for the Olympique de Marseille team that reached the 1999 UEFA Cup Final. However, he remained on the bench as they lost 3–0 to Parma.

External links
 
 

1963 births
Living people
French footballers
Association football goalkeepers
Paris Saint-Germain F.C. players
Red Star F.C. players
AS Saint-Étienne players
Olympique Lyonnais players
Stade Malherbe Caen players
Montpellier HSC players
AS Cannes players
Olympique de Marseille players
Ligue 1 players
Ligue 2 players